This article is about the phonology and phonetics of the West Frisian language.

Consonants

  is often included with the diphthongs, rather than the consonants, as it occurs only in rising diphthongs and sequences of a long vowel followed by glide (see the Diphthongs section).
  does not occur before other alveolar consonants.
The phonetic affricates  (as in tsiis  'cheese' and skodzje  'shake') are subject to the same kind of variation.
 Glottal stop  may precede word-initial vowels. In careful speech, it may also occur between unstressed and stressed vowels or diphthongs.
 All consonants are unaspirated, as in Dutch.

Allophony
 has two allophones: an approximant , which appears word-initially, and a fricative , which occurs elsewhere.

The plosive  generally appears at the beginning of a word and at the beginning of a stressed syllable, with the fricative  occurring elsewhere. However, there are some cases that disturb that distribution, which shows that the allophony is not only caused by stress but also has a morphological factor:
 Compound words preserve intact each allophone of the individual words: berchgeit  "mountain goat" and needgefal  "emergency". That demonstrates plosive  before unstressed syllables.
 Some suffixes draw the stress onto themselves without readjusting the allophones: hartoch  "duke" → hartoginne  "duchess". That creates cases of fricative  before stressed syllables.

Thus, it appears that the underlying representation of words includes the plosive-fricative distinction. In single-morpheme words, that representation follows the above rule of allophony, but in words with multiple morphemes the underlying status (plosive or fricative) must be known to recover the correct pronunciation.

The schwa  is often dropped in the combination , which turns the  into a syllabic sonorant. The specific sonorant that arises depends on the preceding consonant and so it is labial  when it is preceded by labial , alveolar  when it is preceded by labiodental or alveolar , and velar  when preceded by velar .

There are also some other cases.

Final-obstruent devoicing
West Frisian has final obstruent devoicing and so voiced obstruents are merged with the voiceless obstruents at the end of words. Thus, word-final  are merged into voiceless , although final  is rare.

Vowels
The vowel inventory of West Frisian is very rich.

Monophthongs

 The long vowels are considerably longer than the short vowels. The former are generally over 250 ms, and the latter are generally under 150 ms.
 Some speakers merge the long vowels  with the centering diphthongs .
  is infrequent. It and the other long close rounded vowel  are absent in the Leeuwarden dialect.
It can be treated as its stressed equivalent.
 Although they pattern with monophthongs, the long close-mid vowels transcribed  are often realized as narrow closing diphthongs . However, there are exceptions: for instance, speakers of the Hindeloopers dialect realize  as a long monophthong .
  does not occur before .
 Although they pattern with monophthongs, the long open-mid vowels transcribed  tend to be realized as centring diphthongs .
 The Hindeloopers and the Súdwesthoeksk dialects also feature open-mid front rounded vowels , which are not a part of the standard language.
Its phonetic quality has been variously described as central  and back .
  is central .

Diphthongs

 In southwestern dialects, the sequences  are monophthongized to short central .
Phonetically, the first element of the diphthong may be either  or less often .
 Many speakers realise  as rounded .

Rising and long diphthongs
Frisian is traditionally analysed as having both falling and rising diphthongs.  argues that the rising diphthongs are in fact glide-vowel sequences, not real diphthongs. That view is supported by  who transcribe them with consonant symbols , which is the convention that is used in this article.

Frisian also possesses sequences of a long vowel followed by a glide. According to Booij, the glide behaves as a consonant in such sequences since it is shifted entirely to the next syllable when a following vowel is added. Visser also includes sequences of a high vowel plus glide among these. Such sequences are transcribed with a consonant symbol in this article:
 aai  ~ aaien 
 bliuw  ~ bliuwen 
 moai  ~ moaie 
 iuw  ~ iuwen 
 bloei  ~ bloeie

Breaking
Some falling diphthongs alternate with rising diphthongs:

 The  -  alternation occurs only in the pair mentioned above.

References

Bibliography

Further reading

 
 
 
 

West Frisian language
Germanic phonologies